The Orlando International Airport People Movers are a set of automated people mover (APM) systems operating within Orlando International Airport.  The four original people mover systems connect the airport's main terminal to four satellite airside concourses.  A fifth AGT people mover system was installed in 2017 to connect the main terminal with the airport's new Intermodal Terminal.

Landside/Airside shuttles 

The landside/airside shuttles connect the landside terminals A & B with the four satellite airside concourses.  Each airside consists of two guideways that carry a three-car train each.  The trains shuttle back and forth between the terminal and their respective airsides. The stations at the main terminal and the airsides use the Spanish solution: passengers board on an island platform between the two guideways and disembark on side platforms.

Since Airside 4 is the primary concourse for international flights, its system is set up so that when international flights arrive, terminal-bound passengers are not “secure”, while airside-bound passengers have gone through security screening.  Only one set of doors are open at a time, and trains receive a security inspection before boarding secure departing passengers to the airside.  This eliminates the need for international arriving passengers to go through additional security screening before heading to the main terminal.

Currently, Airsides 1 and 3 use a fleet of Mitsubishi Crystal Mover Urbanismo-22 vehicles. Airside 2 and 4 shuttle systems use Bombardier CX-100 vehicles.

The audio announcements on the airside shuttles when the airport opened featured the voice of Jack Wagner.  Wagner is well known for his extensive voice work for the Walt Disney Company and he was the voice onboard the Walt Disney World Monorail System from 1971–1988 (though his voice still delivers the "Please Stand Clear of the doors" on the monorails).  Wagner's voice has largely been replaced on the landside/airside shuttles, but he can still be heard delivering some of the messages on the east two shuttle systems (Airsides 2 and 4).  Orlando Mayor Buddy Dyer also delivers greetings on all of the airside shuttles.

History 

Construction of the current terminal at Orlando International Airport began in 1978 and it opened in 1981.  When the terminal opened, it only consisted of the western half of the landside terminal building and the two airsides on the west side of the terminal which contain Gates 1-59 (present-day Airsides 1 and 3).  The Landside/Airside shuttle systems were built along with the terminal by Westinghouse Electric Corporation.  The terminal's layout was based upon the design of Tampa International Airport, whose Landside/Airside shuttles were also built by Westinghouse.  The lines to Airsides 1 and 3 originally consisted of eight of Westinghouse's second-generation C-100 vehicles, with two two-car trains running to each airside. The trains were later expanded to three cars.

In 1992, the terminal was expanded to the east and Gates 60-99 (present-day Airside 4) along with its shuttle line were built.  The Airside 4 line has operated with CX-100 vehicles (an updated version of the C-100) in three-car trains since its opening.  A shuttle station for one additional airside was built during this expansion.  However, the airside for Gates 100-129 (present-day Airside 2) and the rest of its shuttle line were not built until 2000.  Airside 2 also has three-car CX-100 shuttles.

In 2017, Airside 1 and 3 shuttles' original Westinghouse C-100 were retired due to their age.  The vehicles were replaced with the current Mitsubishi Crystal Mover Urbanismo-22 vehicles. Airsides 2 and 4's CX-100 vehicles remain in service since those systems were built much later and they are not as old.

Intermodal Terminal system 

In 2017, A fifth people mover line was installed to connect landside terminals A and B with the airport's Intermodal Terminal.  The Intermodal Terminal currently includes additional parking as well as a rail station for future use by Brightline and SunRail.  The Intermodal terminal will also connects to the airport's Terminal C, which opened July 2022.

The Intermodal terminal line uses Mitsubishi Crystal Movers, although they heavily differ in appearance than those used for Airsides 1 and 3.  Unlike the landside/airside shuttles, the intermodal terminal line runs in a pinched-loop configuration.

See also 
List of airport people mover systems
Tampa International Airport People Movers

References 

Airport people mover systems in the United States
Innovia people movers
People Movers